The line S12 is a commuter rail route forming part of the Milan suburban railway service, which converges on the city of Milan, Italy.

The route runs over the infrastructure of the Milan Passante and Milan–Piacenza railways.  Like all but one of the other Milan suburban railway service routes, it is operated by Trenord.

Route 
  Milano Bovisa ↔ Melegnano

Line S12, a cross-city route, heads initially in a southerly direction from Milano Bovisa through the Milan Passante railway to Milano Rogoredo. From there, it turns south-east towards its southern terminus, Melegnano.

History 
The route was activated on 12 September 2016.

Stations 
The stations on the S12 are as follows (stations with a coloured background are within the municipality of Milan):

See also 

 History of rail transport in Italy
 List of Milan S Lines stations
 Rail transport in Italy
 Transport in Milan

References

External links
 ATM – official site 
 Trenord – official site 

Milan S Lines
2016 establishments in Italy
Railway lines opened in 2016